The Chinese Ambassador to Luxembourg is the official representative of the People's Republic of China to the Grand Duchy of Luxembourg.

History
The Republic of China (ROC) and Luxembourg recognised each other. From 1948 to 26 October 1971, the Taiwanese Ambassador in Brussels was accredited in Luxembourg City.
On 16 December 1964, the diplomatic rank of the Legation in Luxembourg City was elevated to that of an embassy.
On 26 October 1971, diplomatic relations between the People's Republic of China (PRC) and Luxembourg was established.
Since April 1988, the ambassador has his/her residence in Luxembourg City.

List of representatives

References 

 
Luxembourg
China